Comedy Bang! Bang! is a television series created and hosted by Scott Aukerman. The show aired weekly on IFC and was a spin-off of Aukerman's podcast Comedy Bang! Bang!, which airs on the Earwolf network. Like the podcast, the series featured outlandish and farcical humor, often delivered in a deadpan manner. The mock talk show derived most of its comedy from its surreal spoofs of common late night tropes and from its characters' ineptitude.

Reggie Watts quit Comedy Bang! Bang! halfway through the fourth season, and a few weeks later was offered the job of bandleader for The Late Late Show with James Corden. Musician Kid Cudi took over bandleader and sidekick duties after Watts' departure. The season four finale aired on December 10, 2015, and was Cudi's final episode. The series was renewed for a 20-episode fifth season on May 5, 2015. "Weird Al" Yankovic took over the position of bandleader for the fifth season, which premiered on June 3, 2016.

On August 18, 2016, Aukerman announced that the series would end after season 5, and the finale aired on December 2, 2016.

Production
The show featured celebrity guests playing either themselves or characters. Many of these celebrities were previous guests on the Comedy Bang! Bang! podcast and revisited characters such as Don Dimello (Andy Daly), El Chupacabra (Nick Kroll), Bob Ducca (Seth Morris), Lil' Gary (Thomas Lennon), Huell Howser (James Adomian) and Cake Boss (Paul F. Tompkins). Many frequent collaborators included former Mr. Show with Bob and David cast members such as Paul F. Tompkins, Bob Odenkirk, and David Cross.

The talk show took place in one-third of a wooden shack with modern decorations, surreal pop-art, taxidermy, old books without dust-covers, and houseplants. Various objects had the ability to talk including the taxidermy, houseplants, as well as a couch named Sir Couchley.

"Weird Al" Yankovic (from season 5 onward) provided all of the music on the show including the theme song and interstitial music. Reggie Watts wrote the theme song and first performed it on the podcast. Yankovic later performed his version of Watts' original theme.

Episodes

Reception
Critical reception for Comedy Bang! Bang! was generally mixed to positive, with a rating of 64 on Metacritic, and a top critics rating of 66% on Rotten Tomatoes. Most television critics gave the show positive reviews. Paste reviewer Ross Bonaime called the show "one of the best written shows on TV today", comparing it to Pee-wee's Playhouse. Los Angeles Times television reviewer Robert Lloyd has called the show "amusing", likening it to Space Ghost Coast to Coast. Additionally, the weekly reviews that were posted on The A.V. Club were generally in the B− to A range.

Home media
Comedy Bang! Bang! Season 1 was released on Region 1 DVD on January 21, 2014. The two-disc set consists of all 10 episodes of its first season. Special features include: deleted and extended scenes, full-length alternate celebrity interviews and audio commentaries featuring characters from the show and more.

Comedy Bang! Bang! Season 2 was released on Region 1 DVD on June 24, 2014. The four-disc set consists of all 20 episodes of its second season. Special features include: full episode commentaries, deleted/bonus scenes and interviews, Reggie's season 2 music supercut, VFX tests and more.

References

External links
Comedy Bang! Bang! at IFC.com

2010s American sketch comedy television series
2010s American television talk shows
2010s American variety television series
2012 American television series debuts
2016 American television series endings
American television spin-offs
English-language television shows
IFC (American TV channel) original programming
Television series by Abso Lutely Productions
Television shows based on podcasts